John Francis "Jack" Bruen (March 25, 1949 – December 19, 1997) was an American basketball coach. He's known for coaching Colgate University to two NCAA Tournament appearances, before dying from pancreatic cancer at age 48.

Playing career
Bruen played high school basketball at Power Memorial Academy, alongside Lew Alcindor. His college basketball was played at Catholic University of America, where he graduated in 1972.

Coaching career
Bruen landed his first college head coaching job at his alma mater, where he guided the Cardinals to a 110–72 record from 1982–89, with his teams never falling below the .500 mark. During his time at Catholic, Bruen coached future NCAA Division I head coaches Mike Lonergan and Jimmy Patsos.

In 1989, Bruen took the job at Colgate University. It was there where he coached Adonal Foyle, a 12-year NBA player, and eighth overall pick by the Golden State Warriors in the 1997 NBA Draft. Bruen guided the Red Raiders to consecutive NCAA Tournament appearances in 1995 and 1996, the first NCAA Tournament appearances in school history—and three Patriot League regular season championships.

After being diagnosed with cancer before the start of the 1997 season, Bruen underwent chemotherapy treatments, and hoped to coach for the entire season, only missing one game against St. John's on December 10. He returned to Colgate to and coached his final game against Marist College on December 13, 1997, an 80–69 win. He would die just six days later, amassing a record of 109–127 overall.

Head coaching record

College 

‡ Bruen died on December 20, 1997. Paul Aiello coached the team for the remainder of the season.

References

1949 births
1997 deaths
American men's basketball players
Basketball coaches from New York (state)
Basketball players from New York City
Catholic University Cardinals men's basketball players
Catholic University Cardinals men's basketball coaches
Colgate Raiders men's basketball coaches